Asarlık Hills are hills located in Ankara Province, central Turkey. The area is a registered natural monument of the country.

The area constitutes rare examples of cuesta geomorphology formed by the abrasion of clay layers with different resistances.

Being of both scientific and visual interest, the area with hills was registered a natural monument on August 22, 1994.

References

Hills of Turkey
Natural monuments of Turkey
Landforms of Ankara Province
Nallıhan
Protected areas established in 1994
1994 establishments in Turkey